HMS Speedwell was a  of the British Royal Navy. She was built at Devonport Dockyard from 188–1890. She was converted to a minesweeper in 1909 and continued these duties during the First World War. Speedwell was sold for scrap in 1920.

Design and construction
The Sharpshooter-class was designed under the leadership of William Henry White, the Director of Naval Construction, to be faster and more seaworthy than the preceding prototype torpedo gunboat,  and the three   ships, while carrying a heavier armament. As torpedo gunboats, they were intended to defend the fleet from attack by torpedo-boats, while being capable of carrying out torpedo attacks themselves.

The Sharpshooters were larger than the preceding ships, with a raised forecastle to improve seakeeping. Two triple-expansion steam engines, fed by four locomotive boilers, drove two propeller shafts. The use of locomotive boilers was not a success, with the machinery being unreliable and unable to provide the expected power. The machinery actually delivered  giving a speed of  when forced and  giving  under natural draft.

The ship was armed with two 4.7 inch (120 mm) QF guns mounted fore and aft on the ships centreline, backed up by four 3-pounder (47 mm) guns (two in single mounts on the ship's beam and two in casemates forward). Five 14-inch torpedo tubes were fitted (one fixed in the ship's bow and two twin mounts), with three reload torpedoes carried. The ship had a crew of 91.

Speedwell was laid down at Devonport Dockyard on 12 April 1888 and launched on 15 March 1889. She was completed on 1 July 1890 at a cost of £52,000.

Service
In August 1894 Speedwell took part in that year's Naval Manoeuvres. She again took part in the Naval Manoeuvres in August the next year, where she suffered leaks in one of her high pressure pistons. Under the command of Commander William Benwell, she arrived at Sheerness dockyard from Scotland in September 1902 for a refit. She left for Scotland to join the Home Fleet the following month, and in November 1902 was at Queensferry during the visit of the German Imperial yacht SMY Hohenzollern.

Speedwell was refitted with Reed water-tube boilers in 1903. Speedwell was in reserve at Chatham in 1906 and joined the Home Fleet in 1907. On 14 December 1907 one of Speedwells cutters capsized just off Sheerness Pier. Eight of the fourteen men aboard the cutter were drowned. In 1908 she underwent an extensive refit at Sheerness dockyard, with her boilers being re-tubed,  and was converted to a minesweeper in 1908–1909.

First World War
On the outbreak of the First World War Speedwell joined the newly established Grand Fleet at Scapa Flow in Orkney. In August 1914, the minesweepers attached to the Grand Fleet, including Speedwell were employed on carrying out daily sweeps of the Pentland Firth. On 27 October, the battleship  struck a mine off Tory Island, north-west of Lough Swilly, and despite efforts to tow her to safety, sank later that day.

Speedwell rammed the submarine, which turned over onto her side before disappearing. U-41 had both periscopes damaged and was forced to abort her patrol and return to home.

Speedwell was a member of the Second Fleet Sweeping Flotilla, based at Scapa Flow as part of the Grand Fleet, in July 1917.

Disposal
Speedwell was sold for scrap on 20 March 1920 to the Cornish Salvage Company of Ilfracombe.

Pennant numbers

Notes

References

Bibliography

 

Sharpshooter-class torpedo gunboats
Ships built in Plymouth, Devon
1889 ships